Results of India women's national football team from 1990–1999.

Legend

Till 1990s the Indian Women National Team was controlled by the Women Football Federation of India (WFFI) which was affiliated to Asian Ladies' Football Confederation (ALFC) neither of which were affiliated to AFC or FIFA for which the international matches played by the team from 1975 till 1994 were refused to be recognised by FIFA.

‡ are unofficial friendly matches after 1994, that are Non FIFA A international matches and are not considered for FIFA rankings.

1994

FIFA recognised matches onwards

1995

1997

1998

1999

References

1990